Kamal Ahmed Bamadhaj (23 December 1970 – 12 November 1991) was a political science student and human rights activist, who was killed in the Dili Massacre in East Timor on November 12, 1991.

Of Malaysian and New Zealand parentage, he was the only foreign national to be killed when Indonesian troops opened fire on a funeral procession at the Santa Cruz cemetery in Dili. He attended the University of New South Wales in Sydney, Australia, and worked as an interpreter for Australian aid agencies working in East Timor.

The Indonesian military commander in East Timor, Sintong Panjaitan, who was removed from the post, later went to study in the United States. In 1994, Bamadhaj's mother, Helen Todd, sued Panjaitan for punitive damages in a US court. However, he dismissed the court's decision as 'a joke'  and returned to Indonesia.

A 1999 film, called Punitive Damage, tells the story of Todd's legal battle.

References

External links
Kamal's Diary, November 1991
HELEN TODD, Plaintiff v. SINTONG PANJAITAN, Defendant
Punitive Damage

1970 births
1991 deaths
New Zealand people of Indian descent
New Zealand people of Malaysian descent
New Zealand human rights activists
Protest-related deaths
New Zealand expatriates in Indonesia
New Zealand expatriates in East Timor
Deaths by firearm in East Timor
Deaths by firearm in Indonesia
Malaysian people of Indian descent